Djalma Bezerra dos Santos (19 December 1918 – 3 March 1954), known as just Djalma, was a Brazilian footballer. He played in one match for the Brazil national football team in 1945. He was also part of Brazil's squad for the 1945 South American Championship.

References

External links
 
 

1918 births
1954 deaths
Brazilian footballers
Brazil international footballers
Sportspeople from Recife
Association football forwards
Sport Club do Recife players
CR Vasco da Gama players
Bangu Atlético Clube players